An agency of record (AOR) in advertising and marketing is an agency that is authorized to purchase advertising time (for radio or television advertising) or space (for print or online advertising) on behalf of the company with which they have an agency contract.

References

Advertising industry